Osanloo,Osanlou, is an Iranian surname. Notable people with the surname include:

Arzoo Osanloo (born 1968), Iranian-American anthropologist 
Mansour Osanlou, leading trade union activist in Iran

Iranian-language surnames